The Friendship Cup is a defunct men's tennis tournament that was played on the Grand Prix Tennis Circuit from 1979–1980. The event was held in March in San José, Costa Rica and was played on outdoor hardcourts. Total prize money for both editions was $50,000.

Past finals

Singles

Doubles

References

External links
 1979 ATP tournament results
 1980 ATP tournament results

Hard court tennis tournaments
Grand Prix tennis circuit
Tennis tournaments in Costa Rica
Recurring sporting events established in 1979
Recurring sporting events disestablished in 1980
1979 establishments in Costa Rica
1980 disestablishments in Costa Rica
Sport in San José, Costa Rica